Hooten & the Lady is a British adventure drama television series that follows the story of two treasure hunter partners, British Museum curator Lady Alexandra (Ophelia Lovibond) who teams up with charismatic, roguish American adventurer Hooten (Michael Landes) in a series of global treasure-hunting escapades. It premiered on Sky 1 on 16 September 2016, and aired through 4 November 2016. The series premiered on The CW in the United States on 13 July 2017. It was cancelled by Sky 1 after one series in August 2017.

Synopsis
Travelling across the world together, Ulysses Hooten and Lady Alexandra Lindo-Parker, two initially unwilling partners, search for answers for the world's greatest mysteries. From the Amazon rainforest for Percy Fawcett's long-lost camp, to hunting across Russia for the 51st Fabergé egg, the two explore the world of the mythical and legendary. They travel from the snowy Himalayan Mountains in an attempt to track down the only scroll written by Buddha, to the catacombs of Rome to find the Libri Sibyllini, and to Alexandria on the hunt for Alexander the Great's lost tomb. A continuing storyline is of Alex's mother, Lady Lindo-Parker, who attempts to organise her daughter's wedding to her fiancé  Edward.

Cast

Main
 Michael Landes as Ulysses Hooten
 Ophelia Lovibond as Lady Alexandra Lindo-Parker
 Jessica Hynes as Ella Bond
 Shaun Parkes as Clive Stephenson

Recurring
 Jane Seymour as Lady Lindo-Parker
 Jonathan Bailey as Edward
 Vincent Regan as Kane

Episodes

Reception 
Hooten and the Lady was well received by critics. Sam Wollaston of The Guardian compared the show to Indiana Jones. Louisa Mellor from Den of Geek described the show as being "a great deal of fun" and "enjoyably retro". Latoya Ferguson of Variety described the series as 'predictable' but praised the leads and the lack of romantic involvement between them was 'refreshing'.

U.S. ratings
The CW aired the series in summer 2017.

Season 1

References

External links
 

2016 British television series debuts
2016 British television series endings
British adventure television series
British action television series
Sky UK original programming
English-language television shows
Television shows set in England
Television shows set in Russia
Television shows set in South Africa
Treasure hunt television series